WCLE (1570 AM) is a radio station broadcasting a Regional Mexican format. Licensed to Cleveland, Tennessee, the station is currently owned by Hartline, LLC and features programming from CNN Radio, Motor Racing Network, and Premiere Radio Networks. The station also broadcasts 2 repeaters, W267BI-FM, which broadcasts with a frequency of 101.3 MHz, and a power of 250 watts. The other translator is W256DQ on 99.1 MHz.

As of September 1, 2019, the format of WCLE was changed from talk to Regional Mexican.

The station is a sister station to WCLE-FM, with which it shares a studio.

References

External links

CLE
Mass media in Bradley County, Tennessee